Lohgarh is a village in Notified Area Committee of Zirakpur in district Mohali in state of Punjab in India. This is not to be confused with another namesake Lohgarh (Bilaspur) in Haryana which was capital of first Sikh state under Banda Singh Bahadur from 1710 to 1715.

The postal code of Lohgarh is 140603.

Colonies in Lohgarh
 Sigma City
 Kishor Bihari Immigrants Colony
 Khushank's Villa
 Sigma City Extension
 Dashmesh Colony Patiala HW 
 Randhawa Enclave
 Golden Enclave
 Lohgarh Village
 Panchsheel Enclave
 Badal Colony
 Exchange Colony
 Balaji Enclave
 Freedom Enclave (old name: Balaji Enclave, Phase 2)
 Seristh Colony
 Defence Enclave
 Tribune Colony (Sarv Mangal society)
 Sharma Enclave
 Chaudhary Colony
 Skynet Enclave
 Green Park Colony
 Savitry Enclave
 Dashmesh Colony
 Sigma City Extension

Gurudwara Lohgarh Sahib
It is an historic Sikh temple established way back by Budha Dal.

References

External links
 www.lohgarh.com

Mohali
Villages in Sahibzada Ajit Singh Nagar district
Former capital cities in India